Kam-Neong Ma is a former Chinese actress from Hong Kong. Ma is credited with over 55 films.

Early life 
Ma was born in Guangdong province, China. Ma's sister was Ma Siu-Ying (1908–1978).

Career 
In 1935, Ma became an actress in Hong Kong films. Ma first appeared in Opera Stars and Song Girls, a 1935 Cantonese opera film directed by Kwan Ting-Yam. Ma appeared as a lead actress in The Seductive Empress Now and Then, a 1939 Drama film directed by Hung Chung-Ho and Ma appeared as Empress Lau in Judge Bao Vs. the Eunuch, a 1939 Historical Drama film directed by Wan Hoi-Leng and Hung Chung-Ho. Ma appeared as Empress Dowager in Happy Ending, a 1963 Cantonese opera film directed by Chu Kei. In Ma's later acting career, she appeared in mother roles such as Love Burst (1966), and Little Foursome Family (1966). Ma's last film was Adventure of a Blind Kid, a 1967 Drama film directed by Mok Hong-See. Ma is credited with over 55 films.

Filmography

Films 
This is a partial list of films.
 1935 Opera Stars and Song Girls
 1939 The Seductive Empress Now and Then 
 1939 Judge Bao Vs. the Eunuch – Empress Lau 
 1966 The Elusive Golden Butterfly 
 1966 Love Burst (aka Agrrieve My Wife) – Kong's mother. 
 1966 Little Foursome Family 
 1967 Adventure of a Blind Kid

References

External links 
 Ma Gam Leung at hkcinemagic.com
 Kam-Neong Ma at imdb.com
 Ma Jinniang at dianying.com

Actresses from Guangdong
Hong Kong film actresses
Living people
Year of birth missing (living people)
Singaporean born Hong Kong artists